"There's Nothing Like This" is a song by British soul singer and songwriter Omar (a.k.a. Omar Lye-Fook), initially released in 1990 as his debut-single. The song is taken from his debut album of the same name (1990), and was re-released in 1991, peaking at number 14 in the UK. Additionally, it peaked at number 13 in Luxembourg, number 27 in Germany, number 34 in Sweden and number 35 in France. The song remains his biggest and most well-known hit to date. A music video was produced to promote the single and has a sepia tone. In 2013, a new version of "There's Nothing Like This" was released, featuring Welsh musician Pino Palladino.

Critical reception
Upon the 1990 release, Paul Lester from Melody Maker complimented "There's Nothing Like This" as "a tasty slice of mellifluous ragga-soul shuffling and Stevie Wonder-ful crooning. So laidback it's upside down, or something." David Giles from Music Week wrote, "Only the mighty Blue Nile prevented this marvellous soul-track from reaching the top left-hand corner of the page. Omar is a Kent-born multi-instrumentalist with a wonderfully expressive voice who has created a heavily jazz-influenced sound – complete with George Benson-style guitar – that has seen him top the UK soul charts". After the 1991 release, another editor, Alan Jones, named it Pick of the Week, commenting, "Expensively acquired from the indie Kongo Dance label, Omar's slow, sinewy sleeper from last year is a surefire smash. The young Londoner has been attracting massive audiences at live shows. If he can go on delivering material like this intimately and excellently vocalised swayer he will soon repay Talkin' Loud's investment. Top 10 material." 

Dorian Silver  from NME said, "Believe the hype, there's nothing like this." A reviewer from Newcastle Evening Chronicle wrote, "His cool jazzy title track is one of the best recent chart singles and it's certainly no flash in the pan." The newspaper also noted its "gentle sensual shunter with soul" and "latin and jazz influences." Ralph Tee from the RM Dance Update felt the song is "one of the finest masterpieces in innovative soul ever to come out of the UK." Lindsay Baker from Spin declared it as "achingly pure, gut-wrenching soul."

Track listing
 7" single, UK (1990)
 "There's Nothing Like This" — 4:35
 "Don't Mean a Thing" — 3:45

 12" single, UK (1990)
 "There's Nothing Like This" — 6:10
 "There's Nothing Like This" (Radio Mix) — 4:35
 "Don't Mean a Thing" — 3:45

 CD single, UK & Europe (1991)
 "There's Nothing Like This" (7" Edit) — 4:01
 "There's Nothing Like This" (12") — 6:38
 "There's Nothing Like This" (7" Remix Edit) — 5:15
 "I Don't Mind the Waiting" (7" Edit) — 3:48

Charts

References

 

1990 songs
1991 debut singles
Acid jazz songs
Soul songs
Talkin' Loud singles